Denial is the lead single of album Home by rock band Sevendust and it was released in July 1999. It was one of the songs featured in ATV Offroad Fury.

Track listing
CD single 1

CD single 2

Chart position
The song peaked number 14 on the Billboard Mainstream Rock chart and number 26 on the Modern Rock chart.

Music video
The video was directed by Paul Andresen and was released in September 1999.

Release history

References

Sevendust songs
1999 singles
Songs written by Clint Lowery
Songs written by Morgan Rose
TVT Records singles
1999 songs
Songs written by Lajon Witherspoon
Songs written by John Connolly (musician)
Songs written by Vinnie Hornsby